Ryan Kern (born 26 May 1989) is a Sri Lankan cricketer. He made his Twenty20 debut for Panadura Sports Club in the 2017–18 SLC Twenty20 Tournament on 1 March 2018.

References

External links
 

1989 births
Living people
Sri Lankan cricketers
Panadura Sports Club cricketers
Place of birth missing (living people)